Sinop can refer to:
 Sinop, Turkey, a city on the Black Sea
 Sinop Nuclear Power Plant, was planned in 2013, but cancelled in 2018
 Battle of Sinop, 1853 naval battle in the Sinop port
 Russian ship Sinop, Russian ships named after the battle
 Sinop Province, the province in Turkey of which the above city is the capital
 Sinop (electoral district), the province's electoral district
 Sinop, Mato Grosso, a city in Mato Grosso state, Brazil
 Sinop (grasshopper), a genus of grasshoppers in the family Acrididae
 Sinop (crater), a small crater on Mars

See also
 Sinope (disambiguation)